Julian Bugier (born November 22, 1980, in Blois, Loir-et-Cher), is a French TV journalist.

After working for news channels BFM TV and i Télé; he presented, as a substitute, the 8 o'clock news on weekdays on France 2.

Family  
Julian Bugier  was born in 1980 in Blois (Loir-et-Cher).

His father Jacques Bugier was a literary man and former journalist. His father worked at La République du Centre then at le Monde from 1991 to 2008. Close to François Bayrou, (he followed Francois' presidential campaign in 2007) and to Jack Lang, he died in June 2013 at the age of 59 years.

Julian Bugier is the eldest of two children   He has a sister, Louise.

Career

Television  
Self-educated, Julian pursued a DEUG (Diplôme d'études universitaires générales) in economics without graduating. At 19, he moved to London  (UK) and began his journalistic career on the financial and economic station, Bloomberg TV.  There he reported for two years and then became a production assistant. He then presented for a year and a half on the French branch of Bloomberg TV,.

In November 2005, he participated in the launch of the news channel BFM TV.  From May 2006   and the launch of the second version of the channel, he presented the economy journal every evening from Monday to Friday.  From late 2008, he served  as a substitute presenter of the newspaper chain.

During the summer of 2009, he left BFM news to join the channel of news and current affairs I-Télé. Succeeding Thomas Joubert, he took charge of Info Matin Week-end on Saturday and Sunday from 7:00am to 11:30am. At the beginning of September 2010, Jean-Baptiste Boursier replaced him when Julian took charge of a new show (L'info sans interdit) with Sonia Chironi (and with participation from Robert Ménard) from Monday to Friday between 5:00pm and 7:00pm, and until 8:00pm from November 2010 when Audrey Pulvar was suspended from her show Audrey Pulvar Soir.

In July 2011, he rejoined France 2 to become the substitute for Laurent Delahousse  on the new shows 13 heures and 20 heures on the weekends.  In September 2011, Julian Bugier was appointed  joker (parttime replacement) of David Pujadas, for the Vingt Heures weekday news show on France 2. He replaced at this post Marie Drucker who became substitute presenter of the television news of the weekend.

From January to May 2012, in anticipation of the 2012 French presidential election, Julien presented the short program Elysee me Monday to Saturday at 7:55pm just before the France 2 news.  This short news show allowed viewers to see archives of former French presidential elections. (Campaigns, debates, etc.)

In August 2014, he held both the position of substitute for Vingt Heures both  weekdays and weekends. He thus made twenty-five straight days of news presentation  at France 2

In September 2014, France 2 entrusted him with the presentation of soirées continues (a presentation followed by a debate).

On 27 May 2015, at the entrance to the Pantheon with Pierre Brossolette,  Geneviève de Gaulle-Anthonioz,  Germaine Tillion and Jean Zay, he presented the special show on France 2 Quatre résistants au Panthéon with  consultants at his side Stéphane Bern and Nathalie Saint-Cricq.

Julian Bugier presented, in addition to his work as a part-time substitute, news shows on the weekend between March and July 2015 because of the pregnancy of Marie Drucker.

From 5 September 2015, he presented a weekly consumer magazine show, Tout compte fait on Saturday at 2:40pm on France 2.

On the radio  
During the summers of 2013 and 2014, he hosted l'économie cette semaine et C'est l'économie demain at 9am weekends to 10 hours on Europe 1.

Private life  
Married to economic journalist Claire Fournier, he is father of a boy born in April 2011 and a daughter born in 2013.

Distinction  

Filmography  
 2011 :  Marquis, Film Dominique Farrugia   : Himself, presenting a news program on i Télé   
 2012 :  Sea to drink, Film Jacques Maillot   : Himself, newscaster   
 2012 :  This world is crazy, TV movie Baddredine Mokrani   : Himself, newscaster   
 2013 : Do not do this, do not do that (series)   : Himself, 20-heures news presenter for France 2.   
 2015 : The great divide, film Alexandra Leclère   : Himself, 20-heures news presenter for France 2.
 2017 : L'ascension'', film Ludovic Bernard : Himself

Notes and references 

1981 births
Living people
French television journalists
French male journalists
French television presenters
People from Blois